Shahrdari Semnan Football Club is an Iranian football club based in Semnan, Iran. They currently compete in the Iran Football's 3rd Division.

Season-by-Season

The table below shows the achievements of the club in various competitions.

See also
 Hazfi Cup 2010–11

Football clubs in Iran
Association football clubs established in 2004
2004 establishments in Iran